Russell Butler (born 6 March 1968) is an Australian former diver, born in Melbourne, who competed in the 1988 Summer Olympics and in the 1996 Summer Olympics.

References

1968 births
Living people
Australian male divers
Divers from Melbourne
Olympic divers of Australia
Divers at the 1988 Summer Olympics
Divers at the 1996 Summer Olympics
Australian Institute of Sport divers
Divers at the 1990 Commonwealth Games
Commonwealth Games medallists in diving
Commonwealth Games gold medallists for Australia
20th-century Australian people
Medallists at the 1990 Commonwealth Games